The 2014 Players Championship was a golf tournament in Florida on the PGA Tour, held  at TPC Sawgrass in Ponte Vedra Beach, southeast of Jacksonville. It was the 41st Players Championship.

Martin Kaymer opened with a 63, led after each round, and won his first Players, one stroke ahead of runner-up Jim Furyk. It was the first to feature an eight-figure purse, with a winner's share of $1.8 million.

With defending champion and world number one Tiger Woods out of competition due to back surgery in late March, four entered this Players Championship with an opportunity to ascend to the top of the world rankings. World number two Adam Scott needed a 16th-place finish, third-ranked Henrik Stenson a top-six finish, number four Bubba Watson a solo runner-up, and fifth-ranked Matt Kuchar a win. They finished at T38, T34, T48, and T17, respectively, and Woods remained number one.		

Due to 82 players making the halfway cut (top 70 and ties), a second cut was initiated after the third round.

This was the first year for the new playoff format, a three-hole aggregate beginning on the 16th hole, which was not necessary. After a 90-minute rain delay late in the final round, Kaymer finished with a par in near-darkness. If he had bogeyed the final hole, the playoff would have begun on Monday morning.

Kaymer was the fourth European to win the Players, following Sandy Lyle, Sergio García, and Henrik Stenson. A month later he won the U.S. Open at Pinehurst and became the fourth to win the Players and a major in the same calendar year, joining Jack Nicklaus (1978, Open), Hal Sutton (1983, PGA), and Woods (2001, Masters).

Venue

Course layout

Source:

Field
The field consisted of 144 players meeting the following criteria:

1. Winners of PGA Tour events since last Players
Woody Austin, Bae Sang-moon (2), Jonas Blixt (2,8), Steven Bowditch (2), Jason Dufner (2,4,8), Ken Duke (2), Harris English (2,8,12), Matt Every (2,8,12), Bill Haas (2,7,8), Chesson Hadley, Russell Henley (2,8), J. B. Holmes (3), Dustin Johnson (2,6,8,12), Zach Johnson (2,8,12), Matt Jones (2,8), Chris Kirk (2,12), Matt Kuchar (2,5,6,8,12), Phil Mickelson (2,4,8), Ryan Moore (2,8), Noh Seung-yul, Patrick Reed (2,6,8,12), Justin Rose (2,4,6,8), Adam Scott (2,4,6,8), John Senden (2), Webb Simpson (2,4,8), Brandt Snedeker (2,7,8), Jordan Spieth (2,8,12), Kevin Stadler (2), Scott Stallings (2), Henrik Stenson (2,5,7,8), Jimmy Walker (2,8,12), Bubba Watson (2,4,8,12), Boo Weekley (2), Gary Woodland (2,8)
Jason Day (2,6,8) and Tiger Woods (2,5,6,8) did not play.

2. Top 125 from previous season's FedEx Cup points list
Stuart Appleby, Aaron Baddeley, Charlie Beljan, Jason Bohn, Keegan Bradley (4,6,8), Scott Brown, Ángel Cabrera, Roberto Castro, Greg Chalmers, Kevin Chappell, K. J. Choi (5), Stewart Cink (4), Tim Clark (5), Erik Compton, Ben Crane, Brian Davis, Brendon de Jonge, Graham DeLaet (8), Luke Donald (8), James Driscoll, Ernie Els (4,8), Derek Ernst, Martin Flores, Rickie Fowler (8), Jim Furyk (8), Sergio García (8), Robert Garrigus, Brian Gay, Lucas Glover (4), Luke Guthrie, James Hahn, Brian Harman, David Hearn, J. J. Henry, Justin Hicks, Charley Hoffman, Morgan Hoffmann, Billy Horschel, Charles Howell III, John Huh, Freddie Jacobson, Martin Kaymer (4), Jerry Kelly, Jason Kokrak, Martin Laird, Lee Dong-hwan, Richard H. Lee, Scott Langley, Marc Leishman, Justin Leonard, David Lingmerth, Jeff Maggert, Hunter Mahan (6,8), Graeme McDowell (4,8), William McGirt, Rory McIlroy (4,8), George McNeill, John Merrick, Bryce Molder, Geoff Ogilvy, Jeff Overton, Ryan Palmer, Pat Perez, Carl Pettersson, D. A. Points, Ted Potter Jr., Ian Poulter (6,8), John Rollins, Andrés Romero, Rory Sabbatini, Charl Schwartzel (4,8), Kyle Stanley, Brendan Steele, Kevin Streelman (8), Steve Stricker (8), Chris Stroud, Brian Stuard, Daniel Summerhays, Josh Teater, Michael Thompson, Nicholas Thompson, Cameron Tringale, Bo Van Pelt, Camilo Villegas, Johnson Wagner, Nick Watney, Lee Westwood (8), Charlie Wi, Mark Wilson
Bob Estes, David Lynn, Scott Piercy, and Chez Reavie did not play.

3. Top 125 from current season - Medical Extension
Briny Baird, Jonathan Byrd, Retief Goosen, Kevin Na, Shawn Stefani

4. Major champions from the past five years
Darren Clarke, Louis Oosthuizen (8), Yang Yong-eun

5. Players Championship winners from the past five years

6. WGC winners from the past three years (WGC-HSBC Champions winners from 2011–12 only if PGA Tour members)

7. The Tour Championship winners from the past three years

8. Top 50 from the Official World Golf Ranking
Thomas Bjørn, Jamie Donaldson, Gonzalo Fernández-Castaño, Stephen Gallacher, Thongchai Jaidee, Joost Luiten, Hideki Matsuyama, Francesco Molinari
Victor Dubuisson and Miguel Ángel Jiménez did not play.

9. Senior Players champion from prior year
Kenny Perry

10. Web.com Tour money leader from prior season
Michael Putnam

11. Money leader during the Web.com Tour Finals
John Peterson

12. Top 10 current year FedEx Cup points leaders

13. Remaining positions and alternates filled through current year FedEx Cup standings
Russell Knox, Will MacKenzie

Tiger Woods (2001, 2013) was recovering from back surgery. This was the third time the defending champion did not compete,following 1998 (Steve Elkington, sinus surgery) and  1983 (Jerry Pate, neck).

Nationalities in the field

Round summaries

First round
Thursday, May 8, 2014

Martin Kaymer tied the course record by shooting a nine-under-par 63. His round included nine birdies including seven on the front nine (his second nine), setting the nine-hole record with 29 (−7). Russell Henley was two strokes back and Bae Sang-moon was three back.

Second round
Friday, May 9, 2014

Third round
Saturday, May 10, 2014

Final round
Sunday, May 11, 2014

Scorecard
Final round

Cumulative tournament scores, relative to par
{|class="wikitable" span = 50 style="font-size:85%;
|-
|style="background: Red;" width=10|
|Eagle
|style="background: Pink;" width=10|
|Birdie
|style="background: PaleGreen;" width=10|
|Bogey
|style="background: Green;" width=10|
|Double bogey
|}
Source:

References

External links
The Players Championship website

2014
2014 in golf
2014 in American sports
2014 in sports in Florida
May 2014 sports events in the United States